Kolokotronis (Greek: Κολοκοτρώνης) is a Greek surname. When used without any other context, it refers to the Greek warlord Theodoros Kolokotronis whose contribution to the Greek revolution of 1821 against the Ottoman Empire, was determining for Greece to regain its freedom and become a country after four hundred (400) years of slavery.

When used within a greater context, it may refer to the following notable people:
Apostolis Kolokotronis, Greek military officer
Gennaios Kolokotronis (1805–1868), Greek general
Konstantinos Kolokotronis, Greek revolutionary
Matina Kolokotronis (born 1964), American basketball executive
Panos Kolokotronis, Greek military officer
Theodoros Kolokotronis (1770–1843), Greek general, son of Konstantinos, father of Gennaios and Panos
Theodoros Kolokotronis Stadium in Tripoli, Greece

Greek-language surnames